Tim Sestito (born August 28, 1984 in Rome, New York) is an American former professional ice hockey player who played with the Edmonton Oilers and New Jersey Devils organizations of the National Hockey League (NHL). His younger brother Tom Sestito most recently played for the Toronto Marlies in the American Hockey League (AHL).

Playing career

Undrafted, Sesito played junior hockey with the Plymouth Whalers in the Ontario Hockey League. In 2005, in his first professional season with the Greenville Grrrowl of the ECHL, he scored 21 goals and had 23 assists for the total of 44 points in 72 games. In those 72 games, he also got a total of 127 penalty minutes finishing 3rd for penalties.

On November 22, 2008, Sestito was called up to the Edmonton Oilers to make his first regular season NHL debut.  He played his first regular season game on November 26, 2008 against the Los Angeles Kings. Sestito was the captain of the Oilers top minor hockey league affiliate, the Springfield Falcons of the American Hockey League, before being traded on July 9, 2009 to the New Jersey Devils from the Edmonton Oilers for a conditional draft choice.

On October 14, 2010, Sestito was called up to New Jersey to fill in for Brian Rolston and a depleted Devils roster.

On May 5, 2012, Sestito was called up to New Jersey to make his NHL playoff debut for the injured Ryan Carter during the team's 2012 Stanley Cup Conference Semifinals against the Philadelphia Flyers.

On July 15, 2015, Sestito announced he would be moving to the Kontinental Hockey League to play with the Dinamo Riga for the 2015–16 season. Sestito was named an assistant captain for the Dinamo Riga in his first season with the team.

Personal life
Since retiring from professional hockey, Sestito has served as a fire fighter in his hometown of Rome, New York, with the Rome Fire Department. Sestito now coaches the Utica jr comets.

Career statistics

References

External links
 

1984 births
Living people
Albany Devils players
American expatriate ice hockey players in Latvia
American men's ice hockey centers
Bridgeport Sound Tigers players
Dinamo Riga players
Edmonton Oilers players
Greenville Grrrowl players
Ice hockey players from New York (state)
Lowell Devils players
New Jersey Devils players
Sportspeople from Rome, New York
Plymouth Whalers players
Springfield Falcons players
Stockton Thunder players
Undrafted National Hockey League players
Wilkes-Barre/Scranton Penguins players